"Stream of Life" is a Bengali poem from Gitanjali written by Indian Nobel Laureate Rabindranath Tagore.

Named "Praan" and sung by Palbasha Siddique, it has been used as the background score for Matt Harding's "Dancing 2008" video. The song went on to be among the top ten of Amazon's soundtrack downloads over a week and is also in the top 100 of all of its MP3 downloads.

The lyrics, which are in Bengali:

References

External links

Dancing 2008 video featuring Praan

Bengali-language literature
Bengali poetry
Poems by Rabindranath Tagore
Poems
Indian poems